Rajasthan Financial Corporation (RFC) is the term lending development financial institution in  Rajasthan state in India.  It provides finance to small and medium scale enterprises. It was set up by Government of Rajasthan in  1955.The corporation has  37  branches and 5 sub offices in 33 districts of the State.
Every state of India has its own financial corporation. The headquarter of RFC is at Jaipur.

References

State financial corporations of India
State agencies of Rajasthan
Economy of Rajasthan